The Mount Panorama 500 (known for sponsorship reasons as the Repco Mount Panorama 500) was a Supercars Championship motor racing event held in 2021 at Mount Panorama Circuit in Bathurst, New South Wales, Australia. The event is not intended to return beyond 2021, however will remain an option to replace other cancelled rounds. A championship sprint event at the circuit was previously held six times between 1966 and 1996.

History
The Mount Panorama Circuit is best known as host of the Bathurst 1000 endurance race for touring cars, an event which was first run in Bathurst as the Armstrong 500 in 1963. In addition to the endurance race, generally held in October, the circuit had traditions of hosting a major event over the Easter weekend, dating back to the circuit's first major event, the 1938 Australian Grand Prix. The first four ATCC sprint rounds at the circuit were held as part of the annual Easter event, with the races held on Easter Monday.

The Australian Touring Car Championship, first run in 1960, was held as a single-race event until 1968, with Mount Panorama hosting the championship in 1966. At the event Ian Geoghegan won the second of his five championship titles, and he also went on to win two further sprint rounds at the circuit, including in 1969 when the championship expanded to a multi-round series. The Easter 1972 round, Geoghegan's third win at the event, has been considered as one of the greatest races in championship history due to the close battle between Geoghegan's Ford XY Falcon GTHO Phase III and Allan Moffat's Ford Boss 302 Mustang. The battle between the distinctive Ford models, in which the lead changed hands multiple times, culminated in Moffat needing to loosen his seatbelts to see out the side window with his windscreen covered in oil. From 1974 onwards, the Easter event only featured motorcycles and continued until 1988.

After a championship absence of over two decades, a sprint event returned to Mount Panorama in 1995 and 1996. The event was not on the Easter weekend, however it was still the second major annual event (the maximum permitted at the circuit under the New South Wales legislation of the period) following the demise of the Bathurst 12 Hour after 1994. Both of the 1990s rounds were won by John Bowe, winning the 1995 round without winning either of the two races and then winning all three races in 1996, both of which in the 1994 Bathurst 1000-winning chassis. In 1995, Bowe's team-mate Dick Johnson, who was the first to match Geoghegan as a five time series champion, won his final championship race before suffering a rear wing failure at approximately 280 kilometres per hour while talking to the Seven Network commentators on RaceCam in the second race.

The sprint round did not remain on the calendar in 1997, with two Bathurst 1000s being held instead after a promotional split, while from 1999 the unified Bathurst 1000 itself became a championship round. In 2020, the return of the sprint round was announced to be held in February 2021 as the final round of the extended 2020 season, in a shuffled calendar due to the COVID-19 pandemic. One month later, the event was removed in a further revision of the calendar, which was truncated to again finish within the 2020 calendar year.  Subsequently, an event in February 2021, known as the Mount Panorama 500, was again announced, this time as the first round of the 2021 Supercars Championship. The event featured two single-driver 250 kilometre races, both of which were won by Shane van Gisbergen. With the Bathurst 12 Hour, which usually takes place in February but was cancelled in 2021 due to COVID-19, due to return in 2022, no further sprint events at Mount Panorama are intended beyond 2021.

Winners

Multiple winners

By driver

By team

By manufacturer

Event sponsors
1966, 1969–70, 1995–96: Bathurst
1972: Better Brakes 100
2021: Repco Mount Panorama 500

See also
 List of Australian Touring Car Championship races

Notes

References

Supercars Championship races
Motorsport in Bathurst, New South Wales